Bradley "Brad" Mills (born May 3, 1983) is a Canadian former professional ice hockey Forward who played in the National Hockey League (NHL) with the New Jersey Devils and the Chicago Blackhawks.

Playing career
On March 16, 2007, Mills was signed by the New Jersey Devils to a two-year entry level contract. During the 2010–11 season, Mills was recalled from AHL affiliate, the Albany Devils, and scored his first NHL goal on November 3, 2010 against Marty Turco of the Chicago Blackhawks.

Affected as a free agent by the 2012 NHL lockout, Mills signed a contract with the Utah Grizzlies of the ECHL on October 3, 2012. In scoring 35 points in 27 games during the 2012–13 season with the Grizzlies, Mills was initially loaned to the Rockford IceHogs of the AHL, before he was signed to a contract to remain with the IceHogs on January 31, 2013.

On October 25, 2013, the IceHog's NHL affiliate, the Chicago Blackhawks, signed Mills for the remainder of the season, and immediately recalled him to the NHL.

In the summer of 2014, Mills signed a professional tryout with the Ottawa Senators' AHL affiliate Binghamton Senators. He made the team, and eventually signed a one-year, two-way contract with Ottawa on January 27, 2015. Mills was not recalled to the NHL during the 2014–15 season, appearing in 34 games totalling 14 points with Binghamton in his last season of his professional playing career.

Career statistics

References

External links

1983 births
Living people
Albany Devils players
Binghamton Senators players
Canadian ice hockey centres
Chicago Blackhawks players
Fort McMurray Oil Barons players
Ice hockey people from British Columbia
Lowell Devils players
New Jersey Devils players
People from Terrace, British Columbia
Rockford IceHogs (AHL) players
Trenton Devils players
Undrafted National Hockey League players
Utah Grizzlies (ECHL) players
Yale Bulldogs men's ice hockey players